is a JR West Geibi Line station located in Kōo, Saijō-chō, Shōbara, Hiroshima Prefecture, Japan.

History
1936-11-21: Dōgoyama Station opens
1987-04-01: Japan National Railways is privatized, and Dōgoyama Station becomes a JR West station

Station layout
Dōgoyama Station features one platform. Two platforms used to be in operation, handling two lines, but after one of the lines ceased operation, the second platform stopped being used.

Around the station
There are three ski resorts accessible from this station (distance from station in parentheses). The resorts have activities available year-round:
Takaohara Ski Resort (0.7 km)
Snow Resort Nekoyama (6.2 km)
Dōgoyama Takahara Ski Resort (7.0 km)

There are also a number of other resort areas in addition to the ski resorts above, including:
Kurokan Park (6.1 km)
Suzuran no Yu (onsen, 6.0 km)

Highway access
Japan National Route 314
Hiroshima Prefectural Route 235 (Dōgoyama Teishajō Route)
Hiroshima Prefectural Route 444 (Yuki Onuka Route)
Hiroshima Prefectural Route 446 (Ueki Misaka Route)

Connecting lines
All lines are JR West lines.
Geibi Line
Onuka Station — Dōgoyama Station — Bingo Ochiai Station

External links
 JR West

Geibi Line
Railway stations in Hiroshima Prefecture
Railway stations in Japan opened in 1936
Shōbara, Hiroshima